Lux Aeterna is an album by Dave Fitzgerald. Released in 1997.

This is the second solo album from flute and saxophone player Dave Fitzgerald who was a founding member of Iona. Recorded partly in the studio, and partly in the St. Edmundsbury Cathedral, England, Lux Aeterna covers a number of themes, including the Crucifixion in the chilling "Golgotha"; the Resurrection, and of course, the meaning of 'Light'. The album contains numerous instrumentals, but several tracks include vocals. Guest appearances include Adrian Snell, Claire Tomlin (Monteverdi Choir, Ex Cathedra choir), Joanne Hogg (lead singer of Iona), Nick Beggs (ex Iona and Kajagoogoo) and the St. Edmundsbury Cathedral Choir.

Track listing
 "Ave Verum Corpus"
 "Light"
 "Christchild"
 "Transfiguration"
 "Sanctus"
 "Golgotha"
 "Steal Away"
 "Resurrection"
 "Peace Be With You"
 "Light - Vocal Reprise"
 "Agnus Dei"
 "Only Jesus"

Personnel
Dave Fitzgerald - Soprano & Tenor Saxophones, Flutes, Assorted Woodwind
Adrian Snell - Vocals
Claire Tomlin - Soprano on Steal Away and Agnus Dei; and voice on Peace Be With You.
Joanne Hogg - Soprano 2 on Agnus Dei
Tim Oliver - Keyboards
Nick Beggs - Chapman Stick
Neil Costello - Guitars
Martin Neil - Percussion
Vanessa Freeman - Voice
Sarah Fitzgerald - Child's voice
St. Edmundsbury Cathedral Choir - Choir
Mervyn Cousins - Choir director
Scott Farrell - Cathedral organ

Release Details
1997, UK, ICC Records ICCD20330, Release Date ? ? 1997, CD
1997, UK, ICC Records ICC20320, Release Date ? ? 1997, Cassette

1997 albums
Dave Fitzgerald albums